The Journal of the British Interplanetary Society (JBIS) is a monthly peer-reviewed scientific journal that was established in 1934. The journal covers research on astronautics and space science and technology, including spacecraft design, nozzle theory, launch vehicle design, mission architecture, space stations, lunar exploration, spacecraft propulsion, robotic and crewed exploration of the solar system, interstellar travel, interstellar communications, extraterrestrial intelligence, philosophy, and cosmology. It is published monthly by the British Interplanetary Society.

History 
The journal was established in 1934 when the British Interplanetary Society was founded. The inaugural editorial stated:
The ultimate aim of the society, of course, is the conquest of space and thence interplanetary travel.....(the) immediate task is the stimulation of public interest in the subject of interplanetary travel and the dissemination of knowledge concerning the true nature of the difficulties which as present hinder its achievements.
The first issue was only a six-page pamphlet, but has the distinction of being the world's oldest surviving astronautical publication.

Notable papers 

Notable papers published in the journal include:
 The B.I.S Space-Ship, H.E.Ross, JBIS, 5, pp. 4–9, 1939
 The Challenge of the Spaceship (Astronautics and its Impact Upon Human Society), Arthur C. Clarke, JBIS, 6, pp. 66–78, 1946
 Atomic rocket papers by Les Shepherd, Val Cleaver and others, 1948-1949. 
 Interstellar Flight, L.R.Shepherd, JBIS, 11, pp. 149–167, 1952
 A Programme for Achieving Interplanetary Flight, A.V.Cleaver, JBIS, 13, pp. 1–27, 1954
 Special Issue on World Ships, JBIS, 37, 6, June 1984
 Project Daedalus - Final Study Reports, Alan Bond & Anthony R Martin et al., Special Supplement JBIS, pp.S1-192, 1978

Editors
Some of the people that have been editor-in-chief of the journal are:
 Philip E. Cleator
 J. Hardy
 Gerald V. Groves
 Anthony R. Martin
 Mark Hempsell
 Chris Toomer
 Kelvin Long

See also 
 Spaceflight (magazine)

References

External links 
 
 British Interplanetary Society

Space science journals
Publications established in 1934
Planetary engineering
Monthly journals
English-language journals
1934 establishments in the United Kingdom